Daniel Keene (born 1955) is an Australian playwright whose work has been performed throughout the world.

Career 
Keene's plays have been performed in Australia, France, Poland and the United States. Many of his plays have been published in French translation.

He was co-founder, with Ariette Taylor, of the Keene/Taylor Theatre Project.

Awards
With Ariette Taylor, Keene won the award for Outstanding Contribution to Theatre (Green Room Awards, 1998) and the Kenneth Myer Medallion for the Performing Arts.

He is the winner of a number of drama awards in Australia, and the 2002 production of his play Terminus, directed by Laurent Laffargue at the TNT in Toulouse and the Théâtre de la Ville in Paris, won the Prix Pierre Jean Jacques Gaultier for best direction.

Other awards include:

 1989: Victorian Premier's Literary Awards — Louis Esson Prize for Drama for Silent Partner
 1996: Wal Cherry Play of the Year Award for Best Unproduced Play for Beneath Heaven
 1996: Festival Awards for Literature (SA) — Jill Blewett Playwright's Award for Because You are Mine
 1998: Victorian Premier's Literary Awards — Louis Esson Prize for Drama for Every Minute, Every Hour, Every Day: Five Plays
 2000: New South Wales Premier's Literary Awards — Nick Enright Prize for Playwriting for Scissors, Paper, Rock
 2003: New South Wales Premier's Literary Awards — Nick Enright Prize for Playwriting for Half and Half
 2004: Film Critics Circle of Australia — Best Original Screenplay for Tom White
 2009: New South Wales Premier's Literary Awards — Nick Enright Prize for Playwriting for The Serpent's Teeth: Two Plays
 2011: Queensland Premier's Literary Awards — Best Drama Script (Stage) for Life Without Me

Selected works

Drama
 All Souls (1993)
 Une heure avant la mort de mon frere (1995)
 Little City (1996)
 Silence Complice / Terminus (1999)
 To Whom It May Concern: And Other Plays (2000)
 Avis aux Interesses (2000)
 Pieces Courtes (2001)
 Half and Half (2002)
 La Marche de l'Architecte / Les Paroles (2002)
 Cinq Hommes / Moitie-Moitie (2003)
 Terminus and Other Plays (2003)
 Paradise: Codes Inconnus 1 (2004)
 The Nightwatchman (2005)
 The Serpent's Teeth: 2 Plays (2008)
 The Cove: 8 Short Works (2009) eight short plays presented by If Theatre and directed by Matt Scholten. Plays included Cafe Table, Somewhere in the Middle of the Night, To Whom It May Concern, A Glass of Twilight, The Morning After, A Death, Two Shanks and The First Train. 
 Life Without Me (2010)
 Boxman (2011)
 Photographs of A
 The Long Way Home (2014)
 Mother (2015)

Television scripts 
 The Hour Before My Brother Dies (1986)

Film scripts 
 Silent Partner (2001)
 Tom White (2004)
 Em4Jay (2006)

References

External links

Interview at Theatre Notes
Interview at Australian Stage

Australian dramatists and playwrights
1955 births
Living people